In mathematics, the Fredholm alternative, named after Ivar Fredholm, is one of Fredholm's theorems and is a result in Fredholm theory. It may be expressed in several ways, as a theorem of linear algebra, a theorem of integral equations, or as a theorem on Fredholm operators. Part of the result states that a non-zero complex number in the spectrum of a compact operator is an eigenvalue.

Linear algebra

For each vector v in V there is a vector u in V so that . In other words: T is surjective (and so also bijective, since V is finite-dimensional).

A more elementary formulation, in terms of matrices, is as follows.  Given an m×n matrix A and a m×1 column vector b, exactly one of the following must hold:

Either: A x = b has a solution x
Or: AT y = 0 has a solution y with yTb ≠ 0.

In other words, A x = b has a solution  if and only if for any y s.t. AT y = 0, yTb = 0 .

Integral equations
Let  be an integral kernel, and consider the homogeneous equation, the Fredholm integral equation,

and the inhomogeneous equation

The Fredholm alternative is the statement that, for every non-zero fixed complex number , either the first equation has a non-trivial solution, or the second equation has a solution for all .

The integral operator defined by such a K is called a Hilbert–Schmidt integral operator.

Functional analysis  
Results on the Fredholm operator generalize these results to vector spaces of infinite dimensions, Banach spaces.

The integral equation can be reformulated in terms of operator notation as follows. Write (somewhat informally)

to mean

with  the Dirac delta function, considered as a distribution, or generalized function, in two variables.  Then by convolution, T induces a linear operator acting on a Banach space V of functions , which we also call T, so that

is given by

with  given by

In this language, the Fredholm alternative for integral equations is seen to be analogous to the Fredholm alternative for finite-dimensional linear algebra.

The operator K given by convolution with an L2 kernel, as above, is known as a  Hilbert–Schmidt integral operator.
Such operators are always compact. More generally, the Fredholm alternative is valid when K is any compact operator. The Fredholm alternative may be restated in the following form: a nonzero  either is an eigenvalue of K, or lies in the domain of the resolvent

Elliptic partial differential equations 

The Fredholm alternative can be applied to solving linear elliptic boundary value problems. The basic result is: if the equation and the appropriate Banach spaces have been set up correctly, then either

(1) The homogeneous equation has a nontrivial solution, or

(2) The inhomogeneous equation can be solved uniquely for each choice of data.

The argument goes as follows. A typical simple-to-understand elliptic operator L would be the Laplacian plus some lower order terms. Combined with suitable boundary conditions and expressed on a suitable Banach space X (which encodes both the boundary conditions and the desired regularity of the solution), L becomes an unbounded operator from X to itself, and one attempts to solve

where f ∈ X is some function serving as data for which we want a solution. The Fredholm alternative, together with the theory of elliptic equations, will enable us to organize the solutions of this equation.

A concrete example would be an elliptic boundary-value problem like

supplemented with the boundary condition

where Ω ⊆ Rn is a bounded open set with smooth boundary and h(x) is a fixed coefficient function (a potential, in the case of a Schrödinger operator). The function f ∈ X is the variable data for which we wish to solve the equation. Here one would take X to be the space L2(Ω) of all square-integrable functions on Ω, and dom(L) is then the Sobolev space W 2,2(Ω) ∩ W(Ω), which amounts to the set of all square-integrable functions on Ω whose weak first and second derivatives exist and are square-integrable, and which satisfy a zero boundary condition on ∂Ω.

If X has been selected correctly (as it has in this example), then for μ0 >> 0 the operator L + μ0 is positive, and then employing elliptic estimates, one can prove that  L + μ0 : dom(L) → X is a bijection, and its inverse is a compact, everywhere-defined operator K from X to X, with image equal to dom(L). We fix one such μ0, but its value is not important as it is only a tool.

We may then transform the Fredholm alternative, stated above for compact operators, into a statement about the solvability of the boundary-value problem (*)–(**). The Fredholm alternative, as stated above, asserts:

 For each λ ∈ R, either λ is an eigenvalue of K, or the operator K − λ is bijective from X to itself.

Let us explore the two alternatives as they play out for the boundary-value problem. Suppose λ ≠ 0. Then either

(A)  λ is an eigenvalue of K ⇔  there is a solution h ∈ dom(L) of (L + μ0) h = λ−1h ⇔
–μ0+λ−1 is an eigenvalue of L.

(B) The operator K − λ : X → X is a bijection ⇔ (K − λ) (L + μ0) = Id − λ (L + μ0) : dom(L) → X is a bijection ⇔  L + μ0 − λ−1 : dom(L) → X is a bijection.

Replacing -μ0+λ−1 by λ, and treating the case λ = −μ0 separately, this yields the following Fredholm alternative for an elliptic boundary-value problem:

For each λ ∈ R, either the homogeneous equation (L − λ) u = 0 has a nontrivial solution, or the inhomogeneous equation (L − λ) u = f possesses a unique solution u ∈ dom(L) for each given datum f ∈ X.

The latter function u solves the boundary-value problem (*)–(**) introduced above. This is the dichotomy that was claimed in (1)–(2) above. By the spectral theorem for compact operators, one also obtains that the set of λ for which the solvability fails is a discrete subset of R (the eigenvalues of L). The eigenvalues’ associated eigenfunctions can be thought of as "resonances" that block the solvability of the equation.

See also 

Spectral theory of compact operators
Farkas' lemma

References
 
 A. G. Ramm, "A Simple Proof of the Fredholm Alternative and a Characterization of the Fredholm Operators", American Mathematical Monthly, 108 (2001) p. 855.
 
 

Fredholm theory
Linear algebra